Miss Panamá 2013 the 47th Annual Miss Panamá pageant was held at the Atlapa Convention Centre, Panama City, Panama, on Tuesday, 30 April 2013.

This is the third edition of the pageant under the management of Marisela Moreno former Miss World Panama, the OMP (Miss Panamá Organization) and  broadcast live on Telemetro. About 13 contestants from all over Panamá competed for the prestigious crown. Miss Panamá 2012, Stephanie Vander Werf of Panamá Centro crowned to Carolina Brid of Veraguas at the end of the event as the new Miss Panamá Universe, also Astrid Caballero Miss Intercontinental Panamá 2012 of Veraguas crowned to Sara Bello of Los Santos as the new Miss Intercontinental Panamá.

This year there was a new change after three years, returned the final competition entitled "Miss Panamá World" where announced the winner of the Miss Panamá Mundo title. Maricely González Miss Panamá World 2012 of Bocas del Toro crowned  Virginia Hernández of Panamá Centro as the new Miss Panamá World at the end of the event. The winner cannot participate in the competition for Miss Panama Universe.

Carolina Brid, Miss Panamá Universe represented Panama in Miss Universe 2013 held in Moscow, Russia on November 9, 2013. Virginia Hernández, Miss Panamá World on the other hand represented the country in Miss World 2013 held in Jakarta, Indonesia on September 28, 2013. Sara Bello, Miss Panamá Intercontinental represented the country in Miss Intercontinental 2013 in November 2013.

Final Result

Placements

Special awards

National Costume Competition
This year the contestant, was celebrated in a private casting. It is a competition showing the country's wealth embodied in the colorful and fascinating costumes made by Panamenian designers combining the past and present of Panama. The winner costume represent Panamá in Miss Universe 2013.

Preliminary Interview
Held on Monday April 29 to Miss Panama candidates were qualified in swimsuit and personal interview.

Judges
Rosario Grajales 
Alvaro Alvarado - Journalist and TV news presenter.
Ana Gabriela Strathaman
Rolando Espino - Specialist in Beauty pageants 
Muriel Rens - 1st runner up Miss International 1987.
Stefanie de Roux - TV presenter and Miss Panama 2002.
Luis Camnitzer - Conceptual artist who creates work in a variety of media.
Irene Esser - Miss Venezuela 2011.
Hector Alfonzo 
Ericka Nota

Official Contestants 
These are the competitors who have been selected this year.

Presentation Show
This Preliminary Competition also called The Runway  and the Council of the Misses was celebrated on 4 March 2013, is the night when the third finalists were selected from Miss Panama 2012. A jury panel, together with the advice of the misses, selected the finalists based on the outputs of the girls during the event in the Swimsuit and cocktail dress categories.

Historical significance
Panamá Centro & Veraguas placed again in the final round for consecutive year.
Veraguas has placed in the final round for four consecutive years.
Veraguas won the Miss Panama title for four time, last time 2010 with Anyolí Ábrego.
Comarcas was the first representation from her region and placed in the top 6.
Colón returned to make the cut to the finals after several years.
Los Santos won Miss Intercontinental Panamá title for first time.

Preliminary Contestants
Contestants who were part of the top 19, eliminated in the preliminary meeting on March 4, 2013 are in color.

Miss Panamá World
The Miss Panamá Mundo pageant will be held at the Atlapa Convention Center, Ciudad de Panamá, Panama, on January 8, 2012. About 10 contestants from all over Panamá will compete for the prestigious title. This year by decision of the international Miss World Organization, the election of the new global sovereign will be held in a separate competition to the traditional national election. Maricely González Miss Panamá World 2012 crowned her successor at the end of the event. Also the winner is the new queen of the carnival of the city 2013.

Final Result

Placements

Official Contestants 
These are the competitors who have been selected this year for the Miss Panama World.

Special awards

Judges
Enrique Hoo
Anyolí Ábrego: Model and Miss Panamá 2010.
Monica Aguilera
José Agustín Espino: plastic surgeon Organization official Miss Panama.
Sorangel Matos: Internacional Model, Ex Carnival Queen and Miss Panamá 2007

Election Schedule
(Miss Panamá World 2013)
Thursday January 3 presentation Show.
Monday January 7 interview with the juror.
Tuesday January 8 Final night, coronation Miss Panamá World 2013.
(Miss Panamá 2013)
Monday March 4 presentation Show.
March  competition National Costume.
April Final night, coronation Miss Panamá 2013.

Candidates Notes
(Miss Panamá 2013)
Carolina Del Carmen Brid Cerrud was Miss Tourism International Panamá 2011 and  participate in the Miss Tourism International 2011 in Malaysia. She was 1st Runner-up (Miss Tourism Metropolitan International).
Claudia De León 2010 Ellas Fotogenica and Chica Avon 2010, in the 2012 participate in Miss Panamá 2012 but did no place in the top 12 finalist.
Arianny Chávez participate in the national pageant Bellezas Panamá 2010 where she was 1st Runner-up.
Jeniffer Brown participate in the national pageant Miss Top Model Panama 2012
Maria Gabrielle Sealy was Miss Teen America Panamá 2007 and Miss Teen Belleza Mundial 2007 also represent Panamá in the Reinado Internacional del Joropo 2011, was 1st Runner-up in the Panama City Carnival 2011.
Zumay Antonios participate in the national pageant Miss Turismo Panamá 2011.

(Miss Panamá World 2013)
Nabil González was Miss Atlantic Panamá 2009 and participate in the Miss Atlántico Internacional 2009 in Montevideo, Uruguay, also participate in the Miss Panamá 2012 representing the Chiriquí Occidente region and represented Panamá in the contest Reinado Internacional de la Ganadería 2012 in Colombia but did no place.
Andrea Quintero was queen of Calle Arriba in the 2011 Las Tablas's Carnival also represent Panamá in the contest Reinado Internacional de la Ganadería 2011 in Colombia but did no place.
Carolina Garzón was Miss Top Model Panamá 2011-2012 (later dethroned).
Yorkibel Marín was Miss Top Model Panamá 2011 and represent Panamá in the Reinado Internacional del Pacífico 2012, won the Miss Congeniality.
Virginia Hernández was Miss World University Panamá 2010 and represent her country in the Miss World University 2010 in Korea where she won the Miss Congeniality.

References

External links
Panamá 2013 official website
Miss Panamá
Facebook

Señorita Panamá
2013 beauty pageants
2013 in Panama